Abdel Hakim Djaziri (born 2 July 1981) is an Algerian table tennis player. He competed in the men's doubles event at the 2004 Summer Olympics.

References

External links
 

1981 births
Living people
Algerian male table tennis players
Olympic table tennis players of Algeria
Table tennis players at the 2004 Summer Olympics
Place of birth missing (living people)
21st-century Algerian people